Real Ánimas Sayula C.F. is a football club that plays in the Liga TDP. It is based in the city of Sayula, Jalisco, Mexico.

History 
The team was founded in October 2015 with the aim of being an option for local youth and bringing professional soccer back to the city after the disappearance of clubs such as Alianza de Sayula and Tecos Sayula. 

The team played its first official match on September 10, 2016, the club was defeated at home by 0–1 against Atlético Tecomán.

Players

First-team squad

References

External links 

Liga MX Official Profile

Football clubs in Jalisco
Association football clubs established in 2015
2015 establishments in Mexico